is an anime series that aired from 1983 to 1984 in Japan, Latin America, Spain and Italy. There were 45 episodes aired at 25 minutes each. Other loosely translated names are "Arbegas", "Arebegas", "Lightspeed ElectroGod Arbegas" and "Arbegas: El Rayo Custodio".

Original story
Three talented students of a technical high school, Daisaku, Tetsuya, and Hotaru, create award-winning robots as part of a school competition. At this time, the evil Derinja race that plans control of all space extends its ambitions to Earth. To combat this threat, Hotaru's father, Professor Mizuki, takes the three robots and modifies them for battle. Albegas, a super robot, is born.

Concept
The three individual robots form by stacking on top of one another to form a super robot called Albegas.  There are six stackable formations. Each one serves a special function.  Individually, the name of the robots are derived from the first 3 letters of the Greek alphabet (Alpha, Beta, and Gamma). Albegas' weapon of choice is the Sanbai Plasma Sword, with which he defeats enemy Derinja robots (called "Mecha-Fighters") by splitting them in half. Each robot also uses an individual sword.

Staff
 Director  Kozo Morishita
 Additional Directors  Masamitsu Sasaki  Masao Ito  Noriyasu Yamauchi  Keiji Hisaoka  Takao Yoshisawa  Masayuki Akehi
 Screen Writers  Akiyoshi Sakai
 Designers  Shigenori Kageyama  Koichi Ohata
 Animation  Hajie Kaneko  Toshio Mori
 Music  Michiaki Watanabe

Characters

Albegas members

Aoba School allies

Derinja (Derringer) Civilization
A race of purple-skinned beings led by Grand Deram, a sentient being made of energy which lives in the center of the Derinja's home planet Deram. "President" Azass is the leader of the invading force stationed at his orbital base and Generalissimo Duston his top army officer, until they are replaced in Episode 29 by Bios and his lieutenant Dari.

Their giant robots, called "Mecha-Fighters" and often prefixed with "Mecha-", act as monsters of the week. A few are piloted, and the pilot is usually killed when Albegas splits their Mecha-Fighter in half. Duston (in Episode 27), Azass (Episode 29) and Bios (Episode 45) suffer this fate as well, while Dari (Episode 44) is badly hurt but taken prisoner by the Albegas staff, dying later in their headquarters.

All remaining Derinja (as well as Bios' second orbital base/mothership) are dematerialized in Episode 45 when Albegas destroys Grand Deram and makes the Deram planet explode.

Robots

A friend of the three pilots, Goro, also piloted the comic relief Gori Robo (in the tradition of Boss Borot from Mazinger Z).

Stackable configurations

When combined, the first listed robot forms the upper torso, head, arms, and thighs of Albegas, the second robot listed forms the midriff, upper backpack, and the backs of the lower legs, and the third robot forms the waist, the lower backpack, and the prominent portion of the lower legs.

Super Abega and New Super Abega
In the beginning of the series, each pilot also used a smaller aircraft, which was flown in through small hatches into the backs of the robots in order to pilot the robots. The three aircraft could also combine into a single jet called the Super Abega.

They were very quickly replaced by a different set of small aircraft that could transform into different bipedal droid forms, and similarly combined into the New Super Abega.

Voltron and Albegas
Albegas was intended to be incorporated into the Voltron universe as the third portion of the Voltron: Defender of the Universe series, but due to the extreme popularity of the GoLion-derived Voltron and lack of popularity of the Dairugger XV–adapted portion of the series, the plan was ultimately scrapped in favor of a season of newly-animated "Lion Voltron" episodes commissioned specifically for the American show. However, die-cast Albegas toys were still released as "Voltron II (a.k.a., "Gladiator Voltron") in the Matchbox Voltron toyline, and Albegas made a brief appearance as Gladiator Voltron in the Voltron comic book series.

Arcade game
Albegas was a laserdisc arcade game produced by Sega, with Toei Animation producing the animation for it. It was released in Japan in March 1984.

In Japan, Game Machine magazine listed Albegas on their July 1, 1984 issue as being the tenth most-successful upright/cockpit arcade unit of the month. In North America, it was going to be published by Bally Midway for the U.S. under the title of Cybernault and a prototype video was made to demonstrate what the game would be like. However, the release of the game was cancelled.

References

External links
 
 Atari HQ
 System 16
 Collection dx

1983 anime television series debuts
1983 Japanese television series debuts
1984 Japanese television series endings
Super robot anime and manga
TV Tokyo original programming
Voltron
Toei Animation television